Richard McMillan (also known as Richard MacMillan) was a Canadian film, television and stage actor.

Early life 
McMillan was born in Beaverton, Ontario, Canada on 20 March 1951 and, as an infant, was adopted by Frank and Mary McMillan. His parents ran the Beaverton Hotel, and provided McMillan and his younger brother, Frank ("Cooch"), a worthy home and surroundings in which to grow up as youngsters. Later in life, McMillan met his biological mother who refused to acknowledge him as her child, which was profoundly felt, and influenced his onstage performances, according to his actress/wife, Anne Louise Bannon. After high school, McMillan moved to Toronto, Ontario and studied theater at Ryerson University but did not graduate, and instead, soon afterwards, joined the Stratford Festival as a young actor.

Career 
In 1982, McMillan became well known for his role as Pooh-Bah ("Lord High Everything Else") in an adaptation, by Brian MacDonald, of the Gilbert and Sullivan operetta, The Mikado. In the 1980s and 1990s, McMillan was a well regarded Shakespearean actor at the Three Rivers Shakespeare Festival hosted by the University of Pittsburgh, as well as an actor in other related stage productions in and around Pittsburgh, Pennsylvania, United States. In 1989, while there, McMillan met his wife, Anne, then a graduate student at the University, who was playing Ophelia to his Hamlet on stage. They married in 1991, in her hometown of Windsor, Ontario, and afterwards, in 1993, the couple had a daughter Maggie.

During this time, McMillan also performed in stage productions in and around Toronto, which included a featured role in Inexpressible Island, a three-act dramatic play by David Young, in 1997. In 2000, McMillan performed as Scar in the Canadian production of The Lion King, a duplicate of the Broadway version, at the Princess of Wales Theatre in Toronto. In addition, McMillan later played the wizard Saruman in a production of  Lord of the Rings. Between performances, McMillan enjoyed painting, playing the piano as well as several sports, including kayaking and, having had 
earned a private pilot's license, flying.

Over the years, McMillan was awarded honors for his acting performances. These honors included several Dora Mavor Moore Awards, a Canadian Screen Award and a Toronto Theatre Critics Award.

According to Richard Rose, artistic director of the Tarragon Theatre in Toronto, and a close personal friend of McMillan, "In the roles he took on, he was noted for presenting fiercely passionate characters that he illuminated with compassion and, conversely, he was a master of the clown — roles that were at once humorous and sad ... As an actor he understood the absurd and the contradictory. I don’t think I have ever seen anyone quite that sad on the stage, and for that the audiences just loved him. You couldn’t take your eyes off him.” 

McMillan was diagnosed with thyroid cancer in 2009, and after a remission, later died of the disease on 17 February 2017 in Toronto at Princess Margaret Hospital at the age of 65.

Filmography

Films (selected)

See also 
 List of Canadian actors

References

External links 
 
 Richard McMillan at MUBI
 
 Richard McMillan – Interview (100:37)
 Richard McMillan in The Mikado (CBC;1982) 
 
 

1951 births
2017 deaths
Canadian male film actors
Canadian male Shakespearean actors
Canadian male voice actors
People from Brock, Ontario
20th-century Canadian male actors
21st-century Canadian male actors